Maryhill is a district of Glasgow, Scotland.

Maryhill may also refer to:

Maryhill (ward), a ward of Glasgow City Council

Places
 Maryhill, Ontario unincorporated community, Canada
 Maryhill, New Zealand, suburb
 Maryhill, Washington census-designated place, United States
 Maryhill Estates, Kentucky city, United States

Organizations and institutions
 Maryhill F.C., a football club in Maryhill, Glasgow, Scotland, United Kingdom
 Maryhill Museum of Art, a registered historic place and museum in Maryhill, Washington, United States
 Maryhill College, in Lucena City, Philippines

See also
Mary Hill (disambiguation)